Charles Reuben Hale (March 14, 1837 – December 25, 1900) was coadjutor bishop of the Episcopal Diocese of Springfield from 1892 to 1900. He was commissioned as a chaplain in the United States Navy on March 10, 1863, and served in that capacity until his resignation on March 26, 1871.

Biography
Charles R. Hale was born in Lewistown, Pennsylvania on March 14, 1837. He graduated from the University of Pennsylvania with an A.M. degree in 1858.

He married Anna McKnight Twiggs on January 12, 1871.

Charles Reuben Hale was consecrated on July 26, 1892 as Coadjutor Bishop of the Diocese of Springfield in the Episcopal Church.

He died in Cairo, Illinois on December 25, 1900.

References

External links 
 Documents by Hale from Project Canterbury

1837 births
1900 deaths
19th-century Anglican bishops in the United States
Anglican chaplains
Episcopal bishops of Springfield
University of Pennsylvania alumni